Nicolas Devilder, the champion in 2008, was eliminated by Adam Vejmělka in the first round.
Óscar Hernández defeated Teymuraz Gabashvili 6–1, 3–6, 6–4 in the final.

Seeds

Draw

Final four

Top half

Bottom half

References
 Main Draw
 Qualifying Draw

Nord LB Open - Singles
Sport in Lower Saxony
2009 Singles